"Ease My Troubled Mind" is a song written by Tom Shapiro, Michael Garvin and Chris Waters, and recorded by American country music group Ricochet.  It was released on January 18, 1997 as the fourth and final single from the album Ricochet. The song reached number 20 on the Billboard Hot Country Singles & Tracks chart.

Music video
The music video was directed by Marc Ball, and premiered on CMT on January 20, 1997.

Chart performance

References

1997 singles
Ricochet (band) songs
Songs written by Michael Garvin
Songs written by Tom Shapiro
Songs written by Chris Waters
Song recordings produced by Ron Chancey
Columbia Records singles
1996 songs